The Canton of Rouvroy is a former canton situated in the department of the Pas-de-Calais and in the Nord-Pas-de-Calais region of northern France. It was disbanded following the French canton reorganisation which came into effect in March 2015. By order of the prefect of the region, on October 18, 2006, the canton was attached to the arrondissement of Lens rather than that of Arras with effect from 1 January 2007. It had a total of 19,419 inhabitants (2012).

Geography 
The canton is organised around Rouvroy in the arrondissement of Lens. The altitude varies from 31 m (Méricourt) to 68 m (Drocourt) for an average altitude of 62 m.

The canton comprised 3 communes:
Drocourt
Méricourt (partly)
Rouvroy

See also
Cantons of Pas-de-Calais 
Communes of Pas-de-Calais 
Arrondissements of the Pas-de-Calais department

References

Rouvroy
2015 disestablishments in France
States and territories disestablished in 2015